CKXS-FM is a Canadian radio station that broadcasts a variety hits format at 99.1 FM in Wallaceburg, Ontario. The station is branded as Your Music Variety.

Owned by Five Amigos Broadcasting Inc., the station was authorized on May 26, 2009.

Long-time local morning man Greg Hetherington is also the principal owner of 99.1 FM.
CKXS is a popular station with customers in the USA near the border also. The core American listeners' being around Algonac, MI USA. To cater to the listeners, some weather is given in "F" as-well as "C". 

The station launched on October 20, 2009 at 9:00 am EDT.

References

External links
99.1 FM Official site
 

https://radio-locator.com/cgi-bin/pat?call=CKXS&service=FM&s=F

Kxs
Kxs
Radio stations established in 2009
2009 establishments in Ontario